Laiken Lockley (born July 21, 2002) is an American pair skater. With her former skating partner, Keenan Prochnow, she is the 2019 U.S. national junior champion. The pair placed within the top six at the 2019 World Junior Championships.

Personal life 
Lockley was born on July 21, 2002, in Arlington Heights, Illinois. She is a part-time student at Rolling Meadows High School and takes online classes with Indiana University High School.

Career 
Lockley began learning to skate in 2005. Her first pair skating partner was Ryan Bedard. The two placed fifth in juvenile pairs at the 2013 U.S. Championships.

Lockley teamed up with Keenan Prochnow in April 2015. During their first season together, the pair competed in the novice ranks, placing fifth at the 2016 U.S. Championships.

Lockley/Prochnow debuted on the ISU Junior Grand Prix series in October 2016. They took bronze in the junior pairs' category at the 2018 U.S. Championships. In April 2018, Lockley fractured a bone in her foot.

Lockley/Prochnow won the junior pairs' title at the 2019 U.S. Championships. They placed fifth in the short program, sixth in the free skate, and sixth overall at the 2019 World Junior Championships in Zagreb, Croatia.

Programs 
(with Prochnow)

Competitive highlights 
JGP: Junior Grand Prix

Pairs with Isbell

Pairs with Prochnow

Ladies' singles

Pairs with  Bedard

References

External links 
 

2002 births
American female pair skaters
Living people
People from Arlington Heights, Illinois
21st-century American women